Vincent Bossou (born 7 February 1986) is a Togolese footballer a centre-back.

Career
Born in Kara, Togo, Bossou began his career by Maranatha F.C. and joined on 15 January 2010 to Étoile Sportive du Sahel who signed a two-year contract. His contract with Étoile Sportive du Sahel  was terminated after only three months and Bossou returned to Maranatha F.C. on 18 March 2010.

In May 2011, he moved to Vietnam and signed a contract with Navibank Saigon F.C.

In 2019, he moved to Pattani, Thailand and signed a contract with Pattani FC

International career
Bossou was part of the Togolese squad for the 2010 African Cup of Nations which withdrew prior to playing a match due to the Togo national football team attack.

International goals
Scores and results list Togo's goal tally first.

References

External links

1986 births
Living people
People from Kara, Togo
Association football central defenders
Togolese footballers
Togo international footballers
Maranatha FC players
Étoile Sportive du Sahel players
Togolese expatriate sportspeople in Tunisia
Expatriate footballers in Tunisia
Togolese expatriate sportspeople in Vietnam
Expatriate footballers in Vietnam
K League 2 players
Goyang Zaicro FC players
Navibank Sài Gòn FC players
2010 Africa Cup of Nations players
2013 Africa Cup of Nations players
2017 Africa Cup of Nations players
Togolese expatriate sportspeople in Thailand
21st-century Togolese people